Leisha Hailey (born July 11, 1971) is an American actress and musician known for playing Alice Pieszecki in the Showtime Networks series The L Word and The L Word: Generation Q. Hailey first came to the public's attention as a musician in the pop duo The Murmurs and has continued her music career as part of the band Uh Huh Her.

Currently, Hailey appears as Alice in The L Word: Generation Q and hosts podcast PANTS with fellow L Word star and close friend, Kate Moennig.

Early life
Born in Okinawa, USCAR (now Japan) to American parents, Hailey grew up in Bellevue, Nebraska.

At 17, she came out as lesbian before moving to New York City to attend the American Academy of Dramatic Arts.

Career

Music
With her Academy classmate Heather Grody, she formed the pop duo The Murmurs in 1991. In the 1990s, they released several albums and toured on the Lilith Fair. In 2001, Hailey and Grody changed their name to Gush. The group disbanded when Hailey was cast in The L Word. In 2005, Hailey founded Marfa Records.

In July 2007, Uh Huh Her, an electropop duo consisting of Hailey and Camila Grey, released an EP entitled I See Red; over a year later they released their first album Common Reaction.

Hailey also co-wrote the Shakira hit song "Don't Bother" for her 2005 hit album Oral Fixation Vol. 2.

Acting
Hailey's television debut was in 1996 when she played a struggling musician on an episode of Boy Meets World. Her first major film role was in the 1997 movie All Over Me.

From 2004 to 2009, she starred as Alice Pieszecki, a journalist, television, and radio show host, on The L Word. At the beginning of the series, Hailey's character identified as bisexual. By the end of the series, specifically in season 5, her character dated mostly women.

In September 2008, Showtime announced Hailey would star in The Farm, a "pilot presentation spinoff" of The L Word, to be written and produced by Ilene Chaiken, creator and executive producer of The L Word. It was announced in April 2009 that the show would not be picked up by Showtime.

Hailey's award-winning indie film La Cucina premiered on Showtime in December 2009, where she plays a straight pregnant newlywed.

Hailey has appeared in several Yoplait yogurt commercials as well as a BMW commercial. In April 2008, Hailey was named spokesperson for Olivia Cruises, a travel company which sells cruises and resort vacations marketed towards lesbian customers. She also stars in the psychological thriller Fertile Ground.

In 2015, Hailey appeared in an episode of long-running The CW show Supernatural as Amelia Novak, the estranged wife of Jimmy Novak (human vessel of the angel Castiel, played by Misha Collins.)

In 2007, Hailey was named the sexiest woman in the AfterEllen Hot 100 list compiled by AfterEllen.com.

Personal life
Hailey dated k.d. lang for nearly five years until breaking up in 2001. She also had a relationship with Nina Garduno from 2004 to 2010. From 2011 to 2016, she was dating her bandmate Camila Grey. In 2011, the couple were involved in a dispute with Southwest Airlines, after being ejected from a flight for arguing with a flight attendant who asked them to stop kissing. She is currently in a relationship with actress Kim Dickens.

Filmography

References

External links

 
 Profile at AfterEllen.com

1971 births
Living people
Actresses from Nebraska
Lesbian singers
American Academy of Dramatic Arts alumni
American film actresses
American television actresses
American LGBT singers
LGBT people from Nebraska
American lesbian actresses
American lesbian musicians
People from Okinawa Prefecture
People from Bellevue, Nebraska
21st-century American women guitarists
20th-century American LGBT people
21st-century American LGBT people
American women podcasters